"I'll Be Lovin' You" is a song written by Paul Overstreet and Don Schlitz, and recorded by American country music artist Lee Greenwood.  It was released in January 1989 as the third single from the album This Is My Country.  The song reached #16 on the Billboard Hot Country Singles & Tracks chart.

Chart performance

References

1989 singles
Lee Greenwood songs
Songs written by Paul Overstreet
Songs written by Don Schlitz
Song recordings produced by Jimmy Bowen
MCA Records singles
1989 songs